Rrapë is a village and a former municipality in the Shkodër County, northern Albania. At the 2015 local government reform it became a subdivision of the municipality Pukë. The population at the 2011 census was 1,337.

Settlements 
There are 8 settlements within Rrapë:
 Bicaj
 Blinisht
 Breg
 Buhot
 Kabash
 Lumz
 Meçe
 Rrapë

References 

Administrative units of Pukë
Former municipalities in Shkodër County
Villages in Shkodër County